Frederick or Fred Morgan may refer to:

 Frederick Courtenay Morgan (1834–1909), British Army officer and Conservative politician
 Frederick Augustus Morgan (1837–1894), Australian mining investor, co-discoverer of the Mount Morgan Mine
 Frederick Morgan (painter) (c. 1850–1927), English painter
 Fred Morgan (sport shooter) (1893–1980), South African Olympic sport shooter, competed in the 1920 Summer Olympics
 Fred Morgan (actor) (1878–1941), British silent film actor
 Fred Morgan (footballer) (1892–1971), Australian rules footballer
 Frederick E. Morgan (1894–1967), British Army World War II general
 Fred Morgan (recorder maker) (1940–1999), Australian recorder maker
 Frederick Cleveland Morgan (1881–1962), department store heir, art collector, museum manager and philanthropist
 George Frederick Morgan (1922–2004), American poet